Congrier is a commune in the Mayenne department in north-western France. The town of Congrier belongs to the canton of Cossé-le-Vivien and the arrondissement of Château-Gontier.

The inhabitants of Congrier are called Congriéens and their number in 2016 was 921.

Geography
The Semnon has its source in the commune.

The town's surface is 24.3 km². It is situated at an altitude of about 80 meters.

References

See also
Communes of the Mayenne department

Communes of Mayenne